Buddha Mountain may refer to:

Buddha Mountain (film), a 2010 Chinese film
Buddha Mountain (Thailand) or Khao Chi Chan, a place in Thailand
Foshan, a place in Guangdong, China whose name literally means "Buddha Mountain"

See also
Thousand Buddha Mountain
Leshan Giant Buddha